The Dr. Henry S. Pernot House is a historic residence in Corvallis, Oregon, United States.

The house was listed on the National Register of Historic Places in 1982.

See also
National Register of Historic Places listings in Benton County, Oregon

References

External links

1896 establishments in Oregon
Historic district contributing properties in Oregon
Houses completed in 1896
Houses in Corvallis, Oregon
Houses on the National Register of Historic Places in Oregon
National Register of Historic Places in Benton County, Oregon
Stick-Eastlake architecture in Oregon